Wyndham Downs is a neighborhood in southwestern Lexington, Kentucky, United States. Its boundaries are Man O War Boulevard and Old Higbee Mill Road to the north, Twain Ridge Road to the south, Clays Mill Road to the east, and Clemens Drive to the west.

Neighborhood statistics (as of 2009)
 Area: 
 Population: 827
 Population density: 4,379 people per square mile
 Median household income: $99,127

References

External links
 Wyndham Downs Homeowners Association

Neighborhoods in Lexington, Kentucky